"What Will You Do (When the Money Goes)?" is a song by Sheffield indie rock band Milburn. It was released on 17 September 2007, as the first single released from their second album, These Are the Facts. On 23 September 2007 it entered the UK Singles Chart at #44 from digital download purchases alone.

Track listing
CD
What Will You Do (When the Money Goes)? 
Bridges & Bicycles 
Little White Lies

7" side one
What Will You Do (When the Money Goes)?
Alarm Bells
7" side two
What Will You Do (When the Money Goes)?
Bridges & Bicycles

2007 singles
Milburn (band) songs
2007 songs
Mercury Records singles